Jean-Yves Le Drian (born 30 June 1947) is a French politician who served as Minister of Europe and Foreign Affairs in the governments of Prime Ministers Édouard Philippe and Jean Castex (2017–2022) and as Minister of Defence under President François Hollande (2012–2017). A former member of the Socialist Party, he had been an Independent from 2018 before founding Territories of Progress in 2020.

Family and education
Jean-Yves Le Drian was born in Lorient to working-class parents, Jean and Louisette, who were active members of the Young Christian Workers (Jeunesse ouvrière chrétienne, JOC). He completed his studies at the University of Rennes 2, where he was an activist for the Union Nationale des Étudiants de France (UNEF). First of all interested by Breton Democratic Union (UDB) in the 1970s, he joined the Socialist Party (PS) in May 1974.

Political career

Early functions
In 1977, he assumed the position of Deputy Mayor of Lorient; one year later, at the age of 30, he became a member of the National Assembly for Morbihan. He served until 1993 and then again from 1997 until 2007. He became Mayor of Lorient in 1981 and retained the office until 1988; he also served as Secretary of State for the Sea under President François Mitterrand from 1991 to 1992.

In the 2004 regional elections, leading the Bretagne à gauche, Bretagne pour tous (PS-PCF-PRG-Les Verts-UDB) list, he won 58.66% of the vote in the runoff and a total of 58 seats in the Regional Council of Brittany. He thus became President of the Regional Council of Brittany. In October 2010 he became President of the Conference of Peripheral Maritime Regions of Europe (CPMR).

Minister of Defence, 2012–2017

Le Drian was nominated to serve as Minister of Defence under President François Hollande on 16 May 2012. He managed the withdrawal of French troops from Afghanistan and the deployment of French troops in the Northern Mali conflict and Operation Barkhane. He is also credited with leading a resurgence in French weapons' exports that have resulted in billions of euros in deals, including the first exports of the Dassault Rafale fighter jet.

On 23 March 2017, Le Drian endorsed Emmanuel Macron's candidacy for President of the Republic. After Macron won the presidential election, he appointed Le Drian as Foreign Minister in the First Philippe government.

Minister for Europe and Foreign Affairs, 2017–2022

Le Drian remained in office when the Second Philippe government was inaugurated; on 8 March 2018, he officially resigned from the Socialist Party.

In August 2019, Le Drian called on Hong Kong authorities to renew talks with Hong Kong protesters to find a peaceful solution to the then ongoing crisis. On 9 October 2019, Le Drian condemned the unilateral Turkish operation in Northeastern Syria and declared that Turkey's military incursion "is jeopardising the anti-Islamic State coalition’s security and humanitarian efforts and is a risk for the security of Europeans".

In 2020, Le Drian created the new movement Territories of Progress with fellow minister Olivier Dussopt.

The announcement of the AUKUS security pact between the United States, the United Kingdom, and Australia in September 2021 sparked a period of diplomatic tensions in French-American and French-Australian relations. The French government received official notification from Australia that the Attack-class submarine project, involving a A$90 billion Australian contract to buy 12 French submarines, was to be cancelled only a few hours before it was publicly announced. In a joint statement, Le Drian and French armed forces minister Florence Parly expressed disappointment at Australia's decision to abandon their joint submarine program with France. Le Drian further stated in a radio interview that the contract termination was a "stab in the back". On 17 September, France recalled its ambassadors from Australia and the US. Despite tension in the past, France had never before withdrawn its ambassador to the United States.

In November 2021, in an interview with the newspaper Le Monde, Le Drian expressed concern about the economic predation weighing on African countries, pointing the finger at China and Russia: "Our competitors have no taboos or limits." According to Le Drian, Europeans must at all costs rebuild their relationship with the African continent.

Awards and honours
  Grand Officier of the Order of Valour
  Grand Cordon of the Order of the Republic
  Officer of the Legion of Honour
  Commander of the Ordre du Mérite Maritime
  Medal of the Order of the Golden Fleece
  Knight Commander of the Order of Merit of the Federal Republic of Germany
  Commander of the National Order of the Ivory Coast
  Grand Cordon of the Order of the Rising Sun
  Grand Officier of the National Order of Mali
  Sash of the Order of the Aztec Eagle
  Commander's Cross with Star of the Order of Merit of the Republic of Poland
  Grand Officier of the National Order of the Lion
  Knight Grand Cross of the Order of Isabella the Catholic

Publications
 Qui est l'ennemi ?, Paris, ed. Le Cerf, 2016

References

External links

|-

1947 births
Living people
French Foreign Ministers
French Ministers of Defence and Veterans Affairs
Knights Grand Cross of the Order of Isabella the Catholic
Presidents of the Regional Council of Brittany
Members of the Regional Council of Brittany
Mayors of places in Brittany
Presidents of French regions and overseas collectivities
20th-century French politicians
21st-century French politicians
Socialist Party (France) politicians
Rennes 2 University alumni
Academic staff of Rennes 2 University
Deputies of the 12th National Assembly of the French Fifth Republic
Grand Cordons of the Order of the Rising Sun
Grand Crosses with Star and Sash of the Order of Merit of the Federal Republic of Germany
Regional councillors of France
French political party founders
Politicians from Lorient
21st-century French diplomats
Recipients of orders, decorations, and medals of Senegal